Mobile Suit Gundam: The Origin is an anime OVA series by Sunrise, adapted from the manga of the same title by Yoshikazu Yasuhiko. It focuses on the stories of Casval Rem Deikun (more famously known as Char Aznable) and his sister Artesia (aka Sayla Mass).

Sunrise announced in June 2011 that an anime adaptation of Gundam The Origin was in production. In March 2014, it was announced it will be a four-episode OVA series with event screenings at Japanese theaters, in celebration of the 35th anniversary of Gundam, and centering on the stories of Casval Deikun and his sister Artesia. The first episode, titled , premiered in limited Japanese theaters on February 28, 2015.  Sunrise produced an English dub recorded at NYAV Post for the first time since Bandai retired their Gundam license. Another two-episode OVA series, Mobile Suit Gundam The Origin: Loum Arc, was released in 2017 and 2018.

A 13-episode television recompilation of the OVA series aired from April 29 to August 12, 2019. On May 25, 2019, it was announced that the English dub of The Origin TV recompilation would make its television broadcast premiere on Adult Swim's Toonami programming block on July 7, 2019. Sugizo produced the theme songs. His band Luna Sea performed the three opening themes, the first being . For the ending themes he decided to collaborate with female singers. The first ending theme is a cover of Daisuke Inoue's , the theme song of 1982's Mobile Suit Gundam III: Encounters in Space, by Sugizo feat. Glim Spanky. The other three ending themes feature Aina the End from BiSH, KOM_I from Wednesday Campanella, and miwa.

Episode list

Mobile Suit Gundam: The Origin

Mobile Suit Gundam: The Origin – Advent of the Red Comet

Notes

References

Mobile Suit Gundam: The Origin
The Origin